.Family tree
Kingdom
Bohemia, Kings of
.
Bohemian royalty